The 2016 Grand National (officially known as the 2016 Crabbie's Grand National for sponsorship reasons) was the 169th annual running of the Grand National horse race at Aintree Racecourse near Liverpool, England. The showpiece steeplechase took place on 9 April 2016, the final day of a three-day meeting. A field of 39 runners competed for a share of a prize fund of £1 million.

The 2016 National was won by  shot Rule The World, ridden by David Mullins and trained by Mouse Morris. In second place was the  joint-favourite The Last Samuri. Sixteen of the 39 runners completed the race, held on the softest going since the 2001 race.

The race was sponsored by ginger-beer producer Crabbie's for the third and final time. It was broadcast live on television by Channel 4 for the fourth year running and the final time; the TV rights moved to ITV in 2017. There was live radio coverage by BBC Radio, which has held the radio rights since 1927, and by Talksport, which covered the main race live for the third time.

Race card

A total of 126 entries were received for consideration in the 2016 Grand National, of which 96 remained after the second of two scratching deadlines, and 87 then advanced to the final confirmation stage. On 7 April the final field of 40 horses was announced as starters for the showpiece race. Four reserves were on standby, but there were no withdrawals before the deadline on 8 April. 

O'Faolains Boy was subsequently a non-runner, being declared lame in the morning of the race, reducing the field to 39 from the maximum of 40. A notable absentee was the 2014 winner Pineau de Re, who was rated 46th in the handicap and thus did not qualify for the final field. The joint-favourites with bookmakers were the 2015 winner and top-weight Many Clouds and The Last Samuri.

 Great Britain unless stated.
 Amateur jockeys denoted by preceding title, e.g. Mr.

Race overview
The outsider Aachen led the field on the first circuit with Double Ross very prominent and The Last Samuri and Many Clouds close behind the leaders. The most notable early faller was the third-favourite Holywell at the second fence. The Romford Pele was in a handy position until falling at the Canal Turn. Silviniaco Conti was pulled up at the 14th whilst On His Own and Sir Des Champs, both trained by Willie Mullins, fell at The Chair. 

As the horses set out on the second circuit some of the early leaders began to fade and the 2015 runner-up Saint Are led the field, with The Last Samuri and Many Clouds disputing second. In the heavy conditions, several riders decided to pull their horses up rather than face Becher's a second time. Many Clouds went to the front at the 19th fence and raced alongside The Last Samuri for several fences before making a bad mistake at the 26th, after which he began to struggle under the top weight.	
 
The Last Samuri led the field into the final turn ahead of Morning Assembly and the 100/1 outsider Vics Canvas, who had made a remarkable recovery after almost falling at Becher's Brook on the first circuit. Rule The World was beginning to make steady progress. The Last Samuri cleared the final fence just ahead of Vics Canvas, with Rule The World a length behind in third place. The three leaders were virtually level at the elbow with Vics Canvas on the rail, Rule The World on the outside and The Last Samuri in between them. In the final furlong Rule The World drew ahead and won by six lengths from The Last Samuri, with eight lengths back to Vics Canvas in third. Gilgamboa finished another two lengths behind in fourth, ahead of Goonyella, Ucello Conti, Vieux Lion Rouge, Morning Assembly and Shutthefrontdoor. Many Clouds was the last of the 16 finishers.

All 39 runners returned to the stables with no major concerns. However, over the three days of the Grand National Festival a total of five horses died from injuries sustained during racing.

Finishing order

The sixteen horses to complete the course finished as follows:

Non-finishers
The runners who failed to complete were as follow:

Broadcasting and media

As the Grand National is accorded the status of an event of national interest in the United Kingdom and is listed on the Ofcom Code on Sports and Other Listed and Designated Events, it must be shown on free-to-air terrestrial television in the UK. The race was broadcast live on TV by Channel 4, as part of their four-year deal for the race secured back in 2012. This was the final year that Channel 4 broadcast the race live, after ITV secured the rights from 2017 onwards.

The coverage was led by Clare Balding and Nick Luck, supported by Emma Spencer, Jim McGrath and Graham Cunningham in the trackside studio. Retired champion jockey Sir Anthony McCoy provided expert opinions throughout the coverage, with reports from Mick Fitzgerald and Alice Plunkett and betting updates by Tanya Stevenson and Brian Gleeson. The commentary team was by Richard Hoiles, Ian Bartlett and Simon Holt, who called the winner home for the final time. After the race, Luck, Fitzgerald and McCoy provided viewers with a fence-by-fence analysis of the race. Channel 4 ran all-day coverage from Aintree on the day of the race, with extended editions of The Morning Line and Weekend Brunch airing prior to the main broadcast. The coverage of the race was watched by 10 million viewers, an increase of 1.1 million on the previous year, and attracted a 59% share of the television audience.

See also
Horse racing in Great Britain
List of British National Hunt races

References

External links

2016
Grand National
Grand National
21st century in Merseyside
Grand National
Grand